Kolby Alexandra Koloff (born May 14, 1996) is an American Christian musician, who primarily plays a Christian pop style of worship music. Her first extended play, Grow, was released by Maxx Recordings in 2015 where its single, "Grow", was her entrant Billboard magazine song.

Early life
Koloff was born Kolby Alexandra Koloff, on May 14, 1996, in Kannapolis, North Carolina, the youngest daughter of Nikita Koloff and his second wife Victoria. She used to be an actress on Preachers' Daughters, before starting her singing and songwriting career.

Music career
Koloff's music recording career commenced in 2015, with her first extended play, Grow, that was released on October 2, 2015, by Maxx Recordings. The single, "Grow", was her debut entrant on the Billboard magazine Christian Airplay chart, where it peaked at No. 34.

Kolby presented at the 5th Annual We Love Christian Music Awards which was broadcast on JUCE TV.

Discography

Extended plays

Singles

References

External links
 Official twitter page

1996 births
Living people
American performers of Christian music
Musicians from North Carolina
Musicians from Tennessee
Songwriters from North Carolina
Songwriters from Tennessee